Judge Williams may refer to:

Alexander Williams Jr. (born 1948), judge of the United States District Court for the District of Maryland
Ann Claire Williams (born 1949), judge of the United States Court of Appeals for the Seventh Circuit
Archibald Williams (judge) (1801–1863), judge of the United States District Court for the District of Kansas
Ashton Hilliard Williams (1891–1962), judge of the United States District Court for the Eastern District of South Carolina
B. John Williams (born 1949), judge of the United States Tax Court
C. J. Williams (judge) (born 1963), judge of the United States District Court for the Northern District of Iowa
David W. Williams (1910–2000), judge of the United States District Court for the Central District of California
Frank J. Williams (born 1940), judge of the U.S. Court of Military Commissions
Glen Morgan Williams (1920–2012), judge of the United States District Court for the Western District of Virginia
Gregory B. Williams (born 1969), judge of United States District Court for the District of Delaware
Jerre Stockton Williams (1916–1993), judge of the United States Court of Appeals for the Fifth Circuit
John A. Williams (judge) (1835–1900), judge of the United States District Court for the Eastern District of Arkansas
Karen J. Williams (1951–2013), judge of the United States Court of Appeals for the Fourth Circuit
Karen M. Williams (born 1963), judge of the United States District Court for the District of New Jersey
Kathleen M. Williams (born 1956), judge of the United States District Court for the Southern District of Florida
Mary Ellen Coster Williams (born 1953), judge of the United States Court of Federal Claims
Omar A. Williams (born 1977), judge of the United States District Court for the District of Connecticut
Paul X. Williams (1908–1994), judge of the United States District Court for the Western District of Arkansas
Richard Leroy Williams (1923–2011), judge of the United States District Court for the Eastern District of Virginia
Robert L. Williams (1868–1948), judge of the United States Court of Appeals for the Tenth Circuit
Spencer Mortimer Williams (1922–2008), judge of the United States District Court for the Northern District of California
Stephen F. Williams (1936–2020), judge of the United States Court of Appeals for the District of Columbia Circuit
Thomas Sutler Williams (1872–1940), judge of the United States Court of Claims

See also
Justice Williams (disambiguation)